Poul Otto (19 December 1913 – 2003) was a Danish athlete. He competed in the men's high jump at the 1936 Summer Olympics.

References

1913 births
2003 deaths
Athletes (track and field) at the 1936 Summer Olympics
Danish male high jumpers
Olympic athletes of Denmark
Place of birth missing